My Daughter, the Socialist is a 1966 Greek comedy film directed by Alekos Sakellarios.

Cast 
 Aliki Vougiouklaki - Liza Delvi
 Dimitris Papamichael - Giorgos Nikolaidis
 Stavros Xenidis - Spyros Lozantos
 Lambros Konstantaras - Antonis Delvis
 Nikitas Platis - Dimitris Dimitriou
 Petros Lohaitis - Petros Darakis
 Chronis Exarhakos - police captain
 Nikos Tsoukas - Vlasis
 Dinos Karydis - factory worker
 Alekos Sakellarios - workers' federation representative

References

External links 

1966 comedy films
1966 films
Greek comedy films